The Transformation of the School: Progressivism in American Education, 1876–1957 is a history of the American Progressive Education movement written by historian Lawrence Cremin and published by Alfred A. Knopf in 1961.

References

Further reading 

 
 
 
 
 
 
 
 
 
 
 
 
 
 
 
 
 

1961 non-fiction books
American history books
English-language books
History books about education
History of education in the United States
Progressive education
Alfred A. Knopf books
Bancroft Prize-winning works